Odontopodisma decipiens is a species of spur-throated grasshopper in the family Acrididae. It is found in Europe.

The IUCN conservation status of Odontopodisma decipiens is "LC", least concern, with no immediate threat to the species' survival. The IUCN status was assessed in 2015.

Subspecies
These subspecies belong to the species Odontopodisma decipiens:
 Odontopodisma decipiens decipiens Ramme, 1951 (Cheating Mountain Grasshopper)
 Odontopodisma decipiens insubrica Nadig, 1980
 Odontopodisma decipiens rubritarsis Buresh & Peshev, 1955

References

External links

 

Melanoplinae
Insects described in 1951
Orthoptera of Europe